Ponsonby may refer to:

Surname
Arthur Ponsonby, 1st Baron Ponsonby of Shulbrede (1871–1946), British politician, writer, and social activist
Arthur Ponsonby, 11th Earl of Bessborough (1912–2002), British peer
Ashley Ponsonby DL, JP (1831–1898), British Liberal politician
Bernard Ponsonby, Scottish broadcast journalist
Brabazon Ponsonby, 1st Earl of Bessborough (1679–1758), British politician and peer
Lady Caroline Ponsonby (1785–1828), married name Lady Caroline Lamb, novelist and the lover of Lord Byron
Cecil Ponsonby (1889–1945), English cricketer, right-handed batsman and wicket-keeper
Chambré Brabazon Ponsonby (1720–1762), Irish Member of Parliament
Chambré Brabazon Ponsonby-Barker (1762–1834), Irish Member of Parliament
Charles Ponsonby (1879–1976), British Conservative politician, Member of Parliament 1935–1950, created 1st Baronet Ponsonby, of Wootton, in 1956
Charles Ponsonby, 2nd Baron de Mauley of Canford (1815–1896), British peer and Liberal politician
Edward Ponsonby, 8th Earl of Bessborough, KP, CB, CVO (1851–1920), British peer
Elizabeth Ponsonby, a prominent member of the Bright Young Things in the 1920s, daughter of Arthur Ponsonby, 1st Baron Ponsonby of Shulbrede
Frederick Ponsonby, 10th Earl of Bessborough (1913–1993), British diplomat, businessman, playwright, Conservative politician and peer
Frederick Ponsonby, 1st Baron Sysonby GCB GCVO PC (1867–1935), British soldier and courtier
Frederick Ponsonby, 3rd Earl of Bessborough (1758–1844), British peer
Frederick Ponsonby, 4th Baron Ponsonby of Shulbrede (born 1958), British peer and Labour politician
Frederick Ponsonby, 6th Earl of Bessborough (1815–1895), a founder of Surrey County Cricket Club and I Zingari
Frederick Ponsonby, 1st Baron Sysonby (1867–1935), British politician
Major-General Sir Frederick Cavendish Ponsonby (1783–1837), British military officer
George Ponsonby (Junior Lord of the Treasury) (1773–1863), Irish politician
George Ponsonby (1755–1817), Lord Chancellor of Ireland
Henrietta Ponsonby, Countess of Bessborough (1761–1821), wife of Frederick Ponsonby, 3rd Earl of Bessborough, mother of Lady Caroline Lamb
Henry Ponsonby (died 1745) (1685–1745), Irish soldier
Sir Henry Ponsonby (1825–1895), Private Secretary to Queen Victoria
Jack Ponsonby (1874–1962), Irish footballer
John Ponsonby (British Army officer) (1866–1952), commanded 5th Division during World War I
Hon. John Ponsonby (politician) (1713–1789), Speaker of the Irish House of Commons
John Ponsonby, 4th Earl of Bessborough (1781–1847), British politician and Lord Lieutenant of Ireland
John Ponsonby, 5th Earl of Bessborough (1809–1880), British peer and politician
John Ponsonby, 1st Viscount Ponsonby of Imokilly, (c.1772–1855), British diplomat
John Ponsonby (RAF officer), Air Vice-Marshal
Loelia Ponsonby (married name Loelia Lindsay) (1902–1993), British peeress, needlewoman and magazine editor
Myles Ponsonby CBE (1924–1999), British soldier, intelligence officer, diplomat and politician
The Rt. Rev. Richard Ponsonby (1722–1815), Bishop of Derry and Raphoe
Roberte Ponsonby, Countess of Bessborough (1892–1979), the daughter of Baron Jean de Neuflize, CVO
Rupert Ponsonby, 7th Baron de Mauley (born 1957), British peer
Rowland Ponsonby Blennerhassett or Rowland Blennerhassett (Irish politician) KC, JP (1850–1913), Irish politician
Thomas Ponsonby, 3rd Baron Ponsonby of Shulbrede (1930–1990), British Labour Party politician
Vere Ponsonby, 9th Earl of Bessborough (1880–1956), British Conservative Party politician, Governor General of Canada
Walter Ponsonby, 7th Earl of Bessborough (1821–1906), British peer and member of the House of Lords
William Ponsonby (British Army officer) KCB (1772–1815), Irish politician and British Army officer killed at the Battle of Waterloo
William Ponsonby (publisher) (died 1604), London publisher of the Elizabethan era
William Ponsonby, 1st Baron Ponsonby of Imokilly (1744–1806), leading Whig politician
William Ponsonby, 1st Baron de Mauley (1787–1855), British peer and Whig politician
William Ponsonby, 2nd Earl of Bessborough, 2nd Earl of Bessborough PC PC (I) (1704–1793), British politician and public servant

Noble titles
Earl of Bessborough
Viscount and Baron Ponsonby of Imokilly
Baron de Mauley
Baron Ponsonby of Shulbrede
Baron Sysonby

Given name
Charles Garrett Ponsonby Moore, 11th Earl of Drogheda, 11th Earl of Drogheda KG, KBE (1910–1989), British peer
Henry Dermot Ponsonby Moore, 12th Earl of Drogheda (born 1937), British photographer known professionally as Derry Moore
Maurice Arthur Ponsonby Wood (1916–2007), Anglican bishop in the Evangelical tradition
Nicholas Hickman Ponsonby Bacon (born 1953), British landowner, businessman and philanthropist
Ponsonby Ogle (1855–1902), British writer and journalist
Robert Ponsonby Staples (1853–1943), 11th Baronet of Lissan House near Cookstown in Co. Tyrone
Robert Ponsonby Tottenham Loftus, Irish Anglican Bishop in the first half of the 19th century
Rowland Ponsonby Blennerhassett (1850–1913), Irish politician
Stephen Ponsonby Peacocke (1813–1872), British officer of the Bombay Army and an artist

Places
Ponsonby, Cumbria, England
Ponsonby Fell, hill in the west of the English Lake District, near Gosforth, Cumbria
Ponsonby, New Zealand, a central suburb of Auckland
Ponsonby (New Zealand electorate), historical parliamentary electorate in Auckland, New Zealand from 1887 to 1890 and from 1946 to 1963
Ponsonby, Quebec, Canada – renamed to Boileau in 1993
Ponsonby, Ontario, ghost town in Ontario, Canada

Other
Reginald Ponsonby-Smythe, Commander of Majestic-16 in Destroy All Humans! 2
Ponsonby AFC, former New Zealand football club, now amalgamated to form Mount Albert-Ponsonby
Ponsonby Ponies, rugby league club based in Ponsonby, New Zealand
Ponsonby RFC, rugby union club based in Auckland, New Zealand
Mr Ponsonby, the fourth novel by New Zealand author Ian Middleton
Ponsonby Britt, the fictional executive producer of TV series including The Rocky and Bullwinkle Show
Ponsonby Rule, constitutional convention in the UK constitutional law involving 21 days' notice for international treaties
Ponsonby's Column, a former monumental column in Valletta, Malta
Percy Ponsonby, a 1939 BBC television comedy programme